Huntjov was according to Snorri Sturlasson king in Nordmøre before and during Harald Fairhair's wars of conquest. Together with his son Solve Klove and his father-in-law, king Nokkve of Romsdal, he led an army to stop king Harald from advancing south from Trøndelag. At the first battle of Solskjell both kings fell, and their kingdoms were taken by Harald.

References
 Sturluson, Snorri. Heimskringla: History of the Kings of Norway, translated Lee M. Hollander. Reprinted University of Texas Press, Austin, 1992. 

Norwegian petty kings
9th-century Norwegian monarchs
Monarchs killed in action